Thamalakane barb (Enteromius thamalakanensis) is a species of cyprinid fish in the genus Enteromius, which occurs in the Okavango and upper Zambezi river systems.

Footnotes 

 

Enteromius
Cyprinid fish of Africa
Taxa named by Henry Weed Fowler
Fish described in 1935